Warning may refer to:

Signal 
 Precautionary statement
 Warning sign
 Warning system
 Warning (traffic stop), issued by a police officer in lieu of a citation following a traffic stop

Books
 A Warning (book), a 2019 book by an anonymous Trump administration official later identified as Miles Taylor
 Warnings (book), a 2017 book by Richard A. Clarke
 The Warning (novel), a 1998 Animorphs novel by K. A. Applegate
 "Warning", a 1962 poem by Jenny Joseph

Films 
 The Warning, a 1915 film produced by Equitable Motion Picture Company
 The Warning (1927 film), an American silent film
 The Warning (1928 film), a British silent film
 Warning (1946 film), a Czechoslovak film
 A Warning (film), a 1953 Czechoslovak drama film
 The Warning (1980 film), an Italian giallo film
 Warning (2013 film), an Indian Hindi thriller film
 Warning (2015 film), a Bangladeshi action comedy film
 The Warning (2015 film), an American horror thriller film
 The Warning (2018 film), a Spanish thriller film
 Warning (2021 film), an American-Polish science fiction thriller film

Music 
 Warning (French band), a 1980–1985 hard-rock band
 Warning (German band), a 1982–1983 electronic music band
 Warning (UK band), a doom metal band
 The Warning (band), a hard rock band from Mexico

Albums
 Warning (Antigama album), 2009
 Warning (Green Day album) or the title song (see below), 2000
 Warning (R. Stevie Moore album), 1988
 Warning (EP), by Sunmi, 2018
 Warning, an EP by SS501, 2005
 The Warning (Hot Chip album) or the title song, 2006
 The Warning (Queensrÿche album) or the title song, 1984
 The Warning, by Daysend, 2007
Warnings (album), an album by I Break Horses

Songs
 "Warning" (Green Day song), 2000
 "Warning" (Incubus song), 2002
 "Warning" (The Notorious B.I.G. song), 1994
 "Warning" (Sejeong song), 2021
 "The Warning" (Eminem song), 2009
 "Warning", by the Aynsley Dunbar Retaliation, 1967
 "Warning", by A from 'A' vs. Monkey Kong
 "Warning!", by Band-Maid from Unseen World, 2021
 "Warning", by Fat Joe and Remy Ma from Plata O Plomo, 2017
 "Warning", by Morgan Wallen from Dangerous: The Double Album, 2021
 "Warning", by Nick Jonas from Nick Jonas, 2014
 "Warning", by Oneohtrix Point Never from Age Of, 2018
 "Warning", by Skindred from Union Black, 2011
 "The Warning", by Nine Inch Nails from Year Zero

Television
 "The Warning" (Dynasty 1986)
 "The Warning" (Dynasty 1988)

Other uses 
 Mount Warning, New South Wales, Australia
 Warning (Australian horse) (born 2016), Australian Thoroughbred racehorse
 Warning (British horse) (1985–2000), British Thoroughbred racehorse

See also 
 
 Fair Warning (disambiguation)
 Warn (disambiguation)
 Warning label